Çamlıalan can refer to:

 Çamlıalan, Gündoğmuş
 Çamlıalan, Şenkaya